Thomas Street is a major northeast-southwest road in the Perth suburbs of  and , connecting Winthrop Avenue with Loftus Street. These roads, together with London Street further north, form State Route 61, which links Crawley with West Perth and Yokine.

History
The road is named after James Thomas, the Director of Public Works 1876 to 1884.

A railway station, to be located at the corner of Thomas Street and Subiaco Road, was proposed in 1892. There were mixed responses from the public, but the construction costs would have been too expansive due to the steep grade. An alternative site was selected nearby, at Kimberley Street. West Leederville railway station opened there on 12 July 1897.

In 1939, there were calls for the road to be rebuilt and  upgraded to dual carriageway standard in the vicinity of Kings Park. In 1940, a plan for construction of the second carriageway was announced by the King's Park Board, the Perth City Council and the Subiaco Municipal Council. The councils would be jointly responsible for the building of the road, with the King's Park Board responsible for the clearing of vegetation. The resumption of a strip of land along the edge of the park needed for the works was approved by an Act of Parliament.

Route description
Thomas Street's southern terminus is a traffic light controlled intersection with Winthrop Avenue and Aberdare Road in Shenton Park, at the north-eastern corner of the Queen Elizabeth II Medical Centre, where Sir Charles Gairdner Hospital is located. North of Kings Park, Thomas Street narrows to a four lane single carriage, with a narrow median strip. It forms the boundary between Subiaco to the west and West Perth to the east of the road. After , the street passes by Princess Margaret Hospital, located between Hay Street and Roberts Road. This section is also part of State Route 65 westbound. The road's northern terminus is situated  further northeast, at its intersection with Loftus Street and Railway Parade. The major intersections along the road are controlled by traffic lights, with the exception of Murray Street.

Major intersections

  Winthrop Avenue (State Route 61 / Tourist Drive 200) south / Aberdare Road west
  Rokeby Road (State Route 64) north / Saw Avenue south
  Kings Park Road (Tourist Drive 200) east / Bagot Road west
  Hay Street (State Route 65 west)
  Murray Street
  Roberts Road west (State Route 65) / Wellington Street east (State Route 65)
  Loftus Street (State Route 61) north-east / Railway Parade north-west & south-east

See also

References

Roads in Perth, Western Australia
Subiaco, Western Australia
West Perth, Western Australia